Ubiquitin carboxyl-terminal hydrolase 34 is an enzyme that in humans is encoded by the USP34 gene.

References

Further reading